is a song recorded by Japanese singer Shizuka Kudo for her thirteenth studio album, I'm Not. It was released by Pony Canyon as the album's second and last single on November 19, 1997.

Background
"Kama Sutra no Densetsu" was written by Shizuka Kudo, under the pseudonym Aeri, and Sharam Q guitarist and leader Hatake. It is the second consecutive single produced by Hatake. "Kama Sutra no Densetsu" is composed in the key of G-sharp minor and Kudo's vocals span from G3 to C5. Lyrically, the song deals with the theme of female persuasion.

Chart performance
The single debuted at number 29 on the Oricon Singles Chart, selling 15,000 copies in its first week. It fell to number 48 the following week, with sales of 7,000 copies. "Kama Sutra no Densetsu" stayed in the top 100 for a total of seven weeks.

Track listing

Charts

References

1997 songs
1997 singles
Songs with lyrics by Shizuka Kudo
Shizuka Kudo songs
Pony Canyon singles